Albury is an electoral district of the Legislative Assembly in the Australian state of New South Wales. It is currently held by Justin Clancy of the Liberal Party.

Albury is a regional electorate in the state's south. It encompasses the local government areas of the City of Albury, Greater Hume Shire, Federation Council, part of Snowy Valleys Council that includes the town of Cabramurra. Its significant population centres include Albury, Culcairn, Jindera, Corowa, Howlong, Holbrook and Tumbarumba.

History
Albury was first created in 1880 from part of Hume and is named after the city of Albury. In 1920, Albury, Wagga Wagga and Corowa were absorbed into Murray, and four members were elected under proportional representation. At the end of proportional representation in 1927, Albury was recreated.

Albury has generally been considered as a heartland seat for the Liberal Party and its predecessors. While Labor has occasionally managed to break the conservative hold on the seat, these have typically occurred only at the peak of a popular government. For instance, former Albury mayor Harold Mair won the seat for Labor in 1978 and held it for a decade–only the second Labor member ever to win it in its present incarnation, and the only one to hold it for more than one term. However, Mair's name recognition in the area was not enough to keep him from being swept out in the landslide Labor defeat of 1988. Liberal Ian Glachan, who had been Mair's opponent in 1984, actually turned Albury into a safe seat in one stroke.

Since then, Labor has never come close to retaking the seat. Labor candidates are usually fortunate to get much more than 30 percent of the primary vote. The Liberal hold on the seat has only been seriously threatened once since then, when Glachan suffered a 16-point swing and bested independent Claire Douglas by only 687 votes. At that election, Labor was pushed into third place. The seat reverted to form in 2003 upon Glachan's retirement. His successor, Greg Aplin, won 61.5 percent of the two-party vote, and Labor was pushed to fourth place on the primary vote behind Aplin and two independents. Aplin held the seat without serious difficulty until 2019, when he handed it to fellow Liberal Justin Clancy.

Members

Election results

References

Electoral districts of New South Wales
1880 establishments in Australia
Constituencies established in 1880
1920 disestablishments in Australia
Constituencies disestablished in 1920
1927 establishments in Australia
Constituencies established in 1927